Fred Banks may refer to:

Fred L. Banks Jr. (born 1942), justice of the Supreme Court of Mississippi
Fred Ray Banks (born 1962), American football wide receiver

See also
Freddie Banks (born 1965), American basketball player
Freddie Banks (American football) (born 1988), American football coach
Frederick Banks (1888–1957), English footballer
Frederick Banks (priest) (fl. 1930s–1960s), Archdeacon of Trinidad